A Protestant Bible is a Christian Bible whose translation or revision was produced by Protestant Christians. Such Bibles comprise 39 books of the Old Testament (according to the Hebrew Bible canon, known especially to non-Protestant Christians as the protocanonical books) and 27 books of the New Testament, for a total of 66 books. Some Protestants use Bibles which also include 14 additional books in a section known as the Apocrypha (though these are not considered canonical) bringing the total to 80 books. This is often contrasted with the 73 books of the Catholic Bible, which includes seven deuterocanonical books as a part of the Old Testament. The division between protocanonical and deuterocanonical books is not accepted by all Protestants who simply view books as being canonical or not and therefore classify books found in the Deuterocanon, along with other books, as part of the Apocrypha.  Sometimes the term "Protestant Bible" is simply used as a shorthand for a bible which contains only the 66 books of the Old and New Testaments.

It was in Luther's Bible of 1534 that the Apocrypha was first published as a separate intertestamental section. To this date, the Apocrypha is "included in the lectionaries of Anglican and Lutheran Churches." The practice of including only the Old and New Testament books within printed bibles was standardized among many English-speaking Protestants following a 1825 decision by the British and Foreign Bible Society. Today, "English Bibles with the Apocrypha are becoming more popular again" and they may be printed as intertestamental books. In contrast, Evangelicals vary among themselves in their attitude to and interest in the Apocrypha but agree in the view that it is non-canonical.

Early Protestant Bibles

The first proto-Protestant Bible translation was Wycliffe's Bible, that appeared in the late 14th century in the vernacular Middle English. Wycliffe's writings greatly influenced the philosophy and teaching of the Czech proto-Reformer Jan Hus ( 1369–1415). The Hussite Bible was translated into Hungarian by two Hussite priests, Tamás Pécsi and Bálint Újlaki, who studied in Prague and were influenced by Jan Hus. They started writing the Hussite Bible after they returned to Hungary and finalized it around 1416. However, the translation was suppressed by the Catholic Inquisition. It was not until the 16th century that translated Bibles became widely available. The full New Testament was translated into Hungarian by János Sylvester in 1541. In 1590 a Calvinist minister, Gáspár Károli, produced the first printed complete Bible in Hungarian, the Vizsoly Bible.

One of the central events in the development of the Protestant Bible canon was the publication of Luther's translation of the Bible into High German (the New Testament was published in 1522; the Old Testament was published in parts and completed in 1534). Following the Protestant Reformation, Protestants Confessions have usually excluded the books which other Christian traditions consider to be deuterocanonical books from the biblical canon (the canon of the Roman Catholic, Eastern Orthodox, and Oriental Orthodox churches differs among themselves as well), most early Protestant Bibles published the Apocrypha along with the Old Testament and New Testament.

The German-language Luther Bible of 1534 did include the Apocrypha. However, unlike in previous Catholic Bibles which interspersed the deuterocanonical books throughout the Old Testament, Martin Luther placed the Apocrypha in a separate section after the Old Testament, setting a precedent for the placement of these books in Protestant Bibles. The books of the Apocrypha were not listed in the table of contents of Luther's 1532 Old Testament and, in accordance with Luther's view of the canon, they were given the well-known title: "Apocrypha: These Books Are Not Held Equal to the Scriptures, but Are Useful and Good to Read" in the 1534 edition of his Bible translation into German.

In the English language, the incomplete Tyndale Bible published in 1525, 1534, and 1536, contained the entire New Testament. Of the Old Testament, although William Tyndale translated around half of its books, only the Pentateuch and the Book of Jonah were published. Viewing the canon as comprising the Old and New Testaments only, Tyndale did not translate any of the Apocrypha. However, the first complete Modern English translation of the Bible, the Coverdale Bible of 1535, did include the Apocrypha. Like Luther, Miles Coverdale placed the Apocrypha in a separate section after the Old Testament. Other early Protestant Bibles such as the Matthew's Bible (1537), Great Bible (1539), Geneva Bible (1560), Bishop's Bible (1568), and the King James Version (1611) included the Old Testament, Apocrypha, and New Testament. Although within the same printed bibles, it was usually to be found in a separate section under the heading of Apocrypha and sometimes carrying a statement to the effect that the such books were non-canonical but useful for reading.

Protestant translations into Italian were made by Antonio Brucioli in 1530, by Massimo Teofilo in 1552 and by Giovanni Diodati in 1607. Diodati was a Calvinist theologian and he was the first translator of the Bible into Italian from Hebrew and Greek sources. Diodati's version is the reference version for Italian Protestantism. This edition was revised in 1641, 1712, 1744, 1819 and 1821. A revised edition in modern Italian, Nuova Diodati, was published in 1991.

Several translations of Luther's Bible were made into Dutch. The first complete Dutch Bible was printed in Antwerp in 1526 by Jacob van Liesvelt. However, the translations of Luther's Bible had Lutheran influences in their interpretation. At the Calvinistic Synod of Dort in 1618/19, it was therefore deemed necessary to have a new translation accurately based on the original languages. The synod requested the States-General of the Netherlands to commission it. The result was the Statenvertaling or States Translation which was completed in 1635 and authorized by the States-General in 1637. From that year until 1657, a half-million copies were printed. It remained authoritative in Dutch Protestant churches well into the 20th century.

Protestant translations into Spanish began with the work of Casiodoro de Reina, a former Catholic monk, who became a Lutheran theologian. With the help of several collaborators, de Reina produced the Biblia del Oso or Bear Bible, the first complete Bible printed in Spanish based on Hebrew and Greek sources. Earlier Spanish translations, such as the 13th-century Alfonsina Bible, translated from Jerome's Vulgate, had been copied by hand. The Bear Bible was first published on 28 September 1569, in Basel, Switzerland. The deuterocanonical books were included within the Old Testament in the 1569 edition. In 1602 Cipriano de Valera, a student of de Reina, published a revision of the Bear Bible which was printed in Amsterdam in which the deuterocanonical books were placed in a section between the Old and New Testaments called the Apocrypha. This translation, subsequently revised, came to be known as the Reina-Valera Bible.

For the following three centuries, most English language Protestant Bibles, including the Authorized Version, continued with the practice of placing the Apocrypha in a separate section after the Old Testament. However, there were some exceptions. A surviving quarto edition of the Great Bible, produced some time after 1549, does not contain the Apocrypha although most copies of the Great Bible did. A 1575 quarto edition of the Bishop's Bible also does not contain them. Subsequently, some copies of the 1599 and 1640 editions of the Geneva Bible were also printed without them. The Anglican King James VI and I, the sponsor of the Authorized King James Version (1611), "threatened anyone who dared to print the Bible without the Apocrypha with heavy fines and a year in jail."

The Souldiers Pocket Bible, of 1643, draws verses largely from the Geneva Bible but only from either the Old or New Testaments. In 1644 the Long Parliament forbade the reading of the Apocrypha in churches and in 1666 the first editions of the King James Bible without the Apocrypha were bound. Similarly, in 1782–83 when the first English Bible was printed in America, it did not contain the Apocrypha and, more generally, English Bibles came increasingly to omit the Apocrypha.

19th-century developments
In 1826, the National Bible Society of Scotland petitioned the British and Foreign Bible Society not to print the Apocrypha, resulting in a decision that no BFBS funds were to pay for printing any Apocryphal books anywhere. They reasoned that by not printing the secondary material of Apocrypha within the Bible, the scriptures would prove to be less costly to produce. The precise form of the resolution was:

Similarly, in 1827, the American Bible Society determined that no bibles issued from their depository should contain the Apocrypha.

Current situation
Since the 19th century changes, many modern editions of the Bible and re-printings of the King James Version of the Bible that are used especially by non-Anglican Protestants omit the Apocrypha section. Additionally, modern non-Catholic re-printings of the Clementine Vulgate commonly omit the Apocrypha section. Many re-printings of older versions of the Bible now omit the apocrypha and many newer translations and revisions have never included them at all. Sometimes the term "Protestant Bible" is used as a shorthand for a bible which only contains the 66 books of the Old and New Testaments.

Although bibles with an Apocrypha section remain rare in protestant churches, more generally English Bibles with the Apocrypha are becoming more popular than they were and they may be printed as intertestamental books. Evangelicals vary among themselves in their attitude to and interest in the Apocrypha. Some view it as a useful historical and theological background to the events of the New Testament while others either have little interest in the Apocrypha or view it with hostility. However, all agree in the view that it is non-canonical.

Books

Protestant Bibles comprise 39 books of the Old Testament (according to the Jewish Hebrew Bible canon, known especially to non-Protestants as the protocanonical books) and the 27 books of the New Testament for a total of 66 books. Some Protestant Bibles, such as the original King James Version, include 14 additional books known as the Apocrypha, though these are not considered canonical. With the Old Testament, Apocrypha, and New Testament, the total number of books in the Protestant Bible becomes 80. Many modern Protestant Bibles print only the Old Testament and New Testament; there is a 400-year intertestamental period in the chronology of the Christian scriptures between the Old and New Testaments. This period is also known as the "400 Silent Years" because it is believed to have been a span where God made no additional canonical revelations to his people.

These Old Testament, Apocrypha and New Testament books of the Bible, with their commonly accepted names among the Protestant Churches, are given below. Note that "1", "2", or "3" as a leading numeral is normally pronounced in the United States as the ordinal number, thus "First Samuel" for "1 Samuel".

Old Testament

 Book of Genesis
 Book of Exodus
 Book of Leviticus
 Book of Numbers
 Book of Deuteronomy
 Book of Joshua
 Book of Judges
 Book of Ruth
 Books of Samuel
 1 Samuel
 2 Samuel
 Books of Kings
 1 Kings
 2 Kings
 Books of Chronicles
 1 Chronicles
 2 Chronicles
 Book of Ezra
 Book of Nehemiah
 Book of Esther
 Book of Job
 Psalms
 Book of Proverbs
 Ecclesiastes
 Song of Songs
 Book of Isaiah
 Book of Jeremiah
 Book of Lamentations
 Book of Ezekiel
 Book of Daniel
 Book of Hosea
 Book of Joel
 Book of Amos
 Book of Obadiah
 Book of Jonah
 Book of Micah
 Book of Nahum
 Book of Habakkuk
 Book of Zephaniah
 Book of Haggai
 Book of Zechariah
 Book of Malachi

Apocrypha (not used in all churches or bibles) 

1 Esdras (3 Esdras Vulgate)
2 Esdras (4 Esdras Vulgate)
Tobit
Judith ("Judeth" in Geneva)
Rest of Esther 
Wisdom of Solomon
Ecclesiasticus (also known as Sirach)
Baruch and the Letter of Jeremiah ("Jeremiah" in Geneva) 
The Prayer of Azariah and Song of the Three Holy Children
Susanna 
Bel and the Dragon 
Prayer of Manasses
1 Maccabees
2 Maccabees
3 Maccabees
4 Maccabees
Psalm 151

New Testament

 Gospel of Matthew
 Gospel of Mark
 Gospel of Luke
 Gospel of John
 Acts of the Apostles
 Epistle to the Romans
 First Epistle to the Corinthians
 Second Epistle to the Corinthians
 Epistle to the Galatians
 Epistle to the Ephesians
 Epistle to the Philippians
 Epistle to the Colossians
 First Epistle to the Thessalonians
 Second Epistle to the Thessalonians
 First Epistle to Timothy
 Second Epistle to Timothy
 Epistle to Titus
 Epistle to Philemon
 Epistle to the Hebrews
 Epistle of James
 First Epistle of Peter
 Second Epistle of Peter
 First Epistle of John
 Second Epistle of John
 Third Epistle of John
 Epistle of Jude
 Book of Revelation

Notable English translations

Most Bible translations into English conform to the Protestant canon and ordering while some offer multiple versions (Protestant, Catholic, Orthodox) with different canon and ordering. For example, the version of the ESV with Apocrypha has been approved as a Catholic bible. 

Most Reformation-era translations of the New Testament are based on the Textus Receptus while many translations of the New Testament produced since 1900 rely upon the eclectic and critical Alexandrian text-type.

Notable English translations include:

A 2014 study into the Bible in American Life found that of those survey respondents who read the Bible, there was an overwhelming favouring of Protestant translations. 55% reported using the King James Version, followed by 19% for the New International Version, 7% for the New Revised Standard Version (printed in both Protestant and Catholic editions), 6% for the New American Bible (a Catholic Bible translation) and 5% for the Living Bible. Other versions were used by fewer than 10%. A 2015 report by the California-based Barna Group found that 39% of American readers of the Bible preferred the King James Version, followed by 13% for the New International Version, 10% for the New King James Version and 8% for the English Standard Version. No other version was favoured by more than 3% of the survey respondents.

See also
 Biblical canon
 Christian biblical canons
 Sola scriptura

Notes

References

Bible versions and translations
Development of the Christian biblical canon
Christian terminology
Bible